The  is one of the two lines of the Sendai Subway system operated by the Sendai City Transportation Bureau in the city of Sendai, Japan. It opened on 6 December 2015. The Tozai Line uses linear motor propulsion.

Stations

From the start of operations on the line, nine out of the line's 13 stations are staffed and operated by sub-contracted employees from the security company Alsok. Operations at Omachi Nishi-koen Station will also be sub-contracted to Alsok from fiscal 2018, leaving only the two termini and Sendai Station staffed by Sendai City Transportation Bureau employees.

Rolling stock

Services are operated by a fleet of 15 four-car Sendai Subway 2000 series electric trains manufactured by Kinki Sharyo.

Passenger statistics
According to forecasts published by Sendai City Transportation Bureau in August 2012, the line is expected initially to be used by an average of approximately 80,000 passengers daily (boarding passengers only).

History
The line opened on 6 December 2015, with a departure ceremony for the first train at Arai Station.

References

External links

  

Transport in Sendai
Linear motor metros
Railway lines opened in 2015
Standard gauge railways in Japan
2015 establishments in Japan